5th Gorki is a rural locality (a village) in Kutuzovskoye Rural Settlement of Solnechnogorsky District, Russia. The population was 34 as of 2010.

Geography 
5th Gorki is located 49 km southeast of Solnechnogorsk (the district's administrative centre) by road. Yurlovo is the nearest rural locality.

Streets 
 Vesennyaya
 Lazurnaya

References 

Rural localities in Moscow Oblast
Solnechnogorsky District